Dhaal is a 1997 Indian Hindi-language action film directed by Sameer Malkan, starring Vinod Khanna and Sunil Shetty.

Plot

Inspector Varun Saxena (Vinod Khanna) successfully apprehends Pilot Baba's (Amrish Puri) son for running over and killing Deodhar (Arun Govil), a fellow police inspector. But Pilot's wily advocate, Indrajit Diwan (Danny Denzongpa), proves him innocent, and he is set free. When Varun confides of his frustrations with his garage-mechanic friend, Suraj (Sunil Shetty), he decides to study law and assist Varun. Later Varun arrests Suraj for attempting to rape Mrs. Deodhar (Kunika) and is put in prison. Subsequently, Mrs. Deodhar is killed and the evidence points to Varun who is also arrested, charged and imprisoned in the same prison as Suraj, who cannot wait to avenge his humiliation.

Cast

Vinod Khanna as Inspector Varun Saxena
Sunil Shetty as Suraj
Amrish Puri as Pilot Baba
Danny Denzongpa as Advocate Indrajit Diwan
Gautami as Sneha Saxena
Arun Govil as Inspector Deodhar
Anjali Jathar as Anjali Diwan 
Lakshmikant Berde as Dodo
Kunika as Mrs. Deodhar

Soundtrack
All music was composed by Anu Malik. The song "Dil Maaka Dhina" is a copy of the Spanish song Macarena. This was Anu Malik's second copy of the song after "Dil Le Le Lena" from the movie Auzaar.

Notes
1.The film brought Vinod Khanna and Sunil Shetty together for the first time. They later worked together in Koyleaanchal (2014).

2.Dhaal was Vinod Khanna's last film as lead hero. He took a sabbitical for 4 years before returning as a character actor with Deewanapan (2001).

References

External links

1997 films
1990s Hindi-language films
Films scored by Anu Malik
Indian action drama films
1997 action films
Hindi-language action films